The Ho-Chunk language (Hoocąk, Hocąk), also known as Winnebago, is the traditional language of the Ho-Chunk (or Winnebago) nation of Native Americans in the United States. The language is part of the Siouan language family, and is closely related to the languages of the Iowa, Missouri, and Oto.

"Winnebago" is an exonym, an Anglicization of the Sauk and Fox word Oinepegi. The anglicized form of the endonym is "Ho-Chunk".

Phonology

Phonemic inventory 
Ho-Chunk's vowel sounds are distinguished by nasality and length. That is to say, the use of a nasal vowel or a long vowel affects a word's meaning.  This is evident in examples such as pąą /pãː/ 'bag' compared to paa /paː/ 'nose', and waruc /ˈwaɾutʃ/ 'to eat' compared to waaruc /ˈwaːɾutʃ/ table.' All of Ho-Chunk's vowels show a length distinction, but only /i a u/ have nasal counterparts. 

Ho-Chunk's consonants are listed in the following table: 

Typical of Mississippi Valley Siouan languages, Ho-Chunk has aspirated /p/ and /k/ phonemes but no aspirated /t/.

Nasalization patterns 
In Ho-Chunk, vowels /i a u/ always occur as nasalized when they follow nasal consonants /m n/. Nasality spreads to an adjacent vowel if that vowel is nasalizable as well.  Nasality spreads across syllable or word boundaries and can move across consonants /h/ and /w/, but is blocked by all other consonants. Examples include nąįžą /nãĩʒã/ 'a tree' and ha'ųwį /haʔũwĩ/ 'we (exclusive) do':

Another frequently occurring nasalization pattern is /r/ to [n] alternation: /r/ is pronounced as [n] when it immediately follows a nasal vowel. That is shown in the definite marker /ra/ on the verb 'have' -nį- , which occurs as [nã] in the sentence 'My knife is dull' below:

Dorsey's Law (Vowel copying rule) 
There is a notable sound law in Ho-Chunk called Dorsey's Law[9] which dictates the following:
 /ORS/ → [OSRS] 
where O is a voiceless obstruent, R is a resonant, and S a syllabic sound. In other words, if there is an underlying voiceless obstruent (in Ho-Chunk, /p/, /c/, /k/, /s/, /š/, and /x/) followed by resonant (/r/, /n/, or /w/), the vowel following the resonant is copied into the proceeding consonant cluster. All Dorsey's Law sequences attested in the language are listed below, with V representing the copied vowel: 
 pVnV 
 pVrV 
 kVnV 
 kVrV 
 kVwV 
 sVnV 
 sVrV 
 sVwV 
 šVnV 
 šVrV 
 šVwV 
 cVwV 
 xVnV 
 xVrV 
 xVwV

Multiple sources advocate that Dorsey's Law is a synchronic process in the language because of the way that things like stress assignment and the morphological process of reduplication are affected by it.

Dorsey's Law can apply within a single morpheme, as in /pra/ becoming [para] in the word paras '(be) wide, flat', or across morpheme boundaries, as in /šra/ becoming [šara] in the word šaraše 'you go there,' where š is the second person pronominal prefixing to the verb rahe 'to be going there.'

Metrical structure 
Ho-Chunk is a mora counting, but syllable accenting language. The stress placement of words spoken in isolation is extremely regular. Single-syllable words always have a long vowel (two moras), and stress falls on the first mora (e.g. áa 'arm').  Two-syllable words have two moras, and primary stress falls on the second mora (e.g. wajé 'dress'). In words longer than two syllables, primary stress most often falls on the third syllable, with secondary stress on each even numbered vowel after the point of primary stress (e.g. waǧįǧį́  'ball,' or hocįcį́k 'boy'). A few rare examples of words with primary stress not on the third syllable include booráxux 'you break something into pieces' and gikąnąhé 'to invite somebody.'  These and other exceptions are a result of syllable weight affecting stress location.  As seen in booráxux 'you break something into pieces,' when one of the first two syllables of a multiple-syllable word is a heavy syllable, then the main stress falls on the second syllable

Generally when words are spoken in sequence to form sentences, each retains its own stress domain.  However, when two or more words are compounded, they are treated as a single word and form a new single stress domain in which the aforementioned patterns apply.  Examples include hąąbókahi 'every day' (a compound consisting of hąąp 'day' and hokahí 'every') and wąągwácek 'young man' (wąąk 'man' and wacék 'young').

Ho-Chunk's stress system is substantially different from that of other Siouan languages, which have main stress on the second syllable or second mora.  It is theorized that Ho-Chunk underwent a stress shift one mora to the right at some point in its history.

Orthography 
The official Ho-Chunk orthography derives from an Americanist version of the International Phonetic Alphabet (IPA). As such, its graphemes broadly resemble those of IPA, and there is a close one-to-one correspondence between graphemes and phonemes. The orthography differs from IPA in that the nasal vowels are indicated using an ogonek. Thus, /ĩ/, /ũ/, and /ã/ are written as į, ų, and ą, respectively. In addition, the postalveolar and palatal consonants are written as c, j, š, ž, and y (in IPA: /tʃ/, /dʒ/, /ʃ/, /ʒ/ and /j/), the velar fricative /ɣ/ is written as ǧ, and the glottal stop is written as ʼ .

The diacritic marks can be referred to in Ho-Chunk with the following terms: sįįc 'tail' for the ogonek, wookąnąk 'hat' for the haček, and hiyuša jikere 'sudden start/stop' for the glottal stop.

For a short period of time in the mid to late 1800s, Ho-Chunk was written with an adaptation of the "Ba-Be-Bi-Bo" syllabics system. As of 1994, however, the official alphabet of the Ho-Chunk Nation is an adaptation of the Latin script.  The Ho-Chunk Nations of Wisconsin and Nebraska represent some sounds differently in the alphabets that they use, as the Wisconsin tribe write a double vowel to mark longer length, and the Nebraska tribe uses a macron over the vowel (compare oo with ō for IPA /o:/). These differences, shown with example words, are demonstrated in the chart below.  In total, the Ho-Chunk writing system consists of 26 consonant and 16 vowel graphs/digraphs.

The sounds of Ho-Chunk with example words

Morphology

Verb structure 
Ho-Chunk is an agglutinating and somewhat fusional language.  Verbs contain several affixes to indicate things like person, number, tense, and mood.

Prefix field 
Ho-Chunk uses prefixes on a verb stem to mark person, locative case, instrumental case, benefactive case, reflexivity (including possessive reflexivity), and reciprocality.

Person prefixes 
Ho-Chunk verbs are inflected with eight pronominal categories marked for person and clusivity. Ho-Chunk is a pro-drop language; pronouns are used very infrequently, and information on grammatical person is found on the verb in the form of one or more prefixes.
 First person singular (abbreviated 1SG)
 Second person singular (abbreviated 2SG)
 Third person singular (abbreviated 3SG)
 First person dual inclusive (abbreviated 1IN.DU)
 First person inclusive plural (abbreviated 1IN.PL)
 First person exclusive plural (abbreviated 1EX.PL)
 Second person plural (abbreviated 2PL)
 Third person plural (abbreviated 3PL)

Person marking in transitive verbs 
Ho-Chunk's transitive verbs are inflected with agent (actor) and patient (undergoer) pronominals. The generic paradigm of the pronominal prefixes in transitive verbs is outlined below. The letter V stands in the place of the verb stem.:

In this table, the null symbol (∅) is used to represent all third person singular actor and patient pronominals.  It indicates that there is no overt prefix for those pronominals (in other words, that they are null morphemes).  Some cells are left blank because there are no pronominal affixes associated with that particular person/number combination.  In cases like these, the action is reflexive (i.e. I do something to myself, or you (plural) do something to yourselves).  Reflexivity in Ho-Chunk is indicated with another prefix, kii-.

The sounds in the prefixes run together in casual speech, often leading to the deletion of the /h/ consonant and thus a long vowel or diphthong.  This is evident in the example waakere 'I put them (standing),' in which the third person plural patient prefix wa- merges with the first person actor prefix ha-, producing waa-.

Person marking in intransitive verbs 
Ho-Chunk's intransitive verbs fall into three main types: intransitive active verbs, intransitive stative verbs, and intransitive 'third person-only' verbs.

Intransitive active verbs are those which involve only human or animate agent(s). An example is šgaac 'play,' which is inflected for person and number as follows:

Intransitive stative verbs involve an action affecting a patient.  This is characteristic of the verb š'aak 'to be old':

Intransitive third-person-only verbs designate states and properties of mostly inanimate things, such as "(to) be delicious" or "(to) be expensive."  They can only be inflected for third person singular or third person plural subjects (e.g. ceexi (∅-ceexi) 'it is expensive' or ceexire (ceexi-ire) 'they are expensive').

Locative prefixes 
Ho-Chunk has two locative prefixes, ha- 'on' or 'onto,' and ho- 'in' or 'into.' These prefixes were first described by William Lipkind in his 1928 grammar of the language[11] . The prefixes are added to a verb stem as seen in the examples below:

A locative prefix may derive a noun, a verb, or both.  This is true for homįk, which can refer to a verb 'to lie in' or a noun 'bed.'  More recent learning materials refer to the ha- prefix as a superessive applicative marker, and the ho- prefix as an inessive applicative marker.

Instrumental prefixes 
Ho-Chunk has a set of instrumental prefixes which indicate that an action is accomplished by means of some instrument, force, or special type of instrumental movement.  These prefixes are translated into English with such phrases as 'by foot,' 'by hand,' or 'by striking.' Some sources list eight instrumental prefixes in Ho-Chunk, while others recognize a ninth nąą- 'by internal force' (phonologically identical to nąą- 'by foot'). These prefixes are listed first with their English translation, then paired with a stem wax 'to break, cut or sever a string-like object':

The instrumental prefixes are identified as 'Inner' or 'Outer' due to their position relative to other prefixes attaching to the verb stem.  Inner prefixes are closer to the verb stem, while outer prefixes are farther away on the left edge of the word.  Instrumental prefixes are found in all Siouan languages, and it is theorized that outer instrumentals originated as nouns or nominalized stems.

Suffix field 
Ho-Chunk's suffixes mark number, tense, mood, negation, and aspect.

Syntax

Basic word order 
Like other Siouan languages, Ho-Chunk's basic word order is Subject-Object-Verb (SOV).An example of a typical sentence is Hinųkra wažątirehižą ruwį 'The woman bought a car.'  In a sentence with two objects, such as Hinųkiža hocįcįhižą wiiwagaxhižą hok'ų 'A girl gave a boy a pencil,' the canonical word order is Subject-Indirect Object-Direct Object-Verb.  Word order is relatively free in Ho-Chunk; however, while a word order such as Wažątirehižą, hinųkra ruwį 'The woman bought a car' is permissabie, the change from the basic neutral word order of SOV requires a prosodic pause indicated by a comma.  Without this pause, an interpretation 'A car bought the woman' is possible, though highly unlikely.

Negation 
Negative phrases are expressed with a particle, such as hąąke 'not' or hąkaga 'never' paired with the suffix/enclitic -nį 'not.'  Both elements are required in such phrases: the particle precedes the verb phrase, while -nį is suffixed to the verb.  The following examples demonstrate this construction:

Language revitalization 
Although the language is highly endangered, there are currently vigorous efforts underway to keep it alive in Ho-Chunk communities.  In Wisconsin, the Hocąk Wazija Haci Language Division runs several language classes, an immersion daycare, and a language apprentice program. In Nebraska, the Ho-Chunk Renaissance program teaches the language in local and reservation schools.  Both tribal governments recognize the importance of technology in language learning, and are active in Facebook and YouTube to reach the younger generation of learners.  A "Ho-Chunk (Hoocąk) Native American Language app" is available for iPhone, iPad, and other iOS devices. Language is a crucial aspect of Ho-Chunk culture:

"Within a lot of Native American cultures, language and culture go together," Lewis St. Cyr, language program director for the Ho-Chunk, said. "You can't have culture without language and you can't have language without culture. The importance of it is of who we are."

Notes

References
Hocąk Teaching Materials (2010). Volume 1: Elements of Grammar/Learner's Dictionary. Helmbrecht, J., Lehmann, C., SUNY Press, .  Volume 2: Texts and Audio-CD, Hartmann, I., Marschke, C.  SUNY Press,

External links
Ho-Chunk and Winnebago Explained
Hocank Language, Documentation of Endangered Languages website (DOBES in German)
Hoocąk Waaziija Haci Language and Culture Division, Ho-Chunk Nation (of Wisconsin) website, extensive materials about Hoçak language and restoration efforts
William Lipkind, "Winnebago Grammar", Wisconsin History
Hocąk-English/English-Hocąk Learner's Dictionary , Second Edition, edited by Johannes Helmbrecht & Christian Lehmann, 2006, University of Erfurt 
Beginning Hocąk on Memrise , based on Wisconsin Hocąk; phrases and vocabulary
 Hoocąk DoReCo corpus compiled by Iren Hartmann. Audio recordings of narrative texts with transcriptions time-aligned at the phone level, translations, and time-aligned morphological annotations.

Ho-Chunk
Indigenous languages of Minnesota
Endangered Siouan-Catawban languages
Native American language revitalization
Western Siouan languages
Endangered indigenous languages of the Americas